Qamrul Islam is a Bangladesh Awami League politician. He is the incumbent Jatiya Sangsad member representing the Dhaka-2 constituency since 2008, and he was Minister of Food from 2014 to 2018.

Islam was the state minister of Law, Justice and Parliamentary Affairs in the Second Hasina Cabinet.

Islam was convicted on contempt of court charges in 2016.

References

Living people
Awami League politicians
Food ministers of Bangladesh
Law, Justice and Parliamentary Affairs ministers of Bangladesh
11th Jatiya Sangsad members
10th Jatiya Sangsad members
9th Jatiya Sangsad members
Place of birth missing (living people)
Year of birth missing (living people)